Meshir 23 - Coptic Calendar - Meshir 25 

The twenty-fourth day of the Coptic month of Meshir, the sixth month of the Coptic year. In common years, this day corresponds to February 18, of the Julian Calendar, and March 3, of the Gregorian Calendar. This day falls in the Coptic Season of Shemu, the season of the Harvest.

Commemorations

Martyrs 

 The martyrdom of Saint Timothy of Gaza 
 The martyrdom of Saint Matthias of Qous

Saints 

 The departure of Saint Agapetus, Bishop of Synnada

References 

Days of the Coptic calendar